Joanna Quiner (August 27, 1796 – September 20, 1868) was an American seamstress and self-taught sculptor.

Born in Beverly, Massachusetts, Quiner was the daughter of Abraham Quiner, Jr. and Susannah Camell. For much of her early life she worked as a seamstress, both in her hometown and in nearby Salem; she did some upholstery for the family of Theodore Parker, and came to admire his views. In 1838 she took a position in the household of Seth Bass, librarian of the Boston Athenaeum. She lived in the Athenaeum building with the Bass family; sculptor Shobal Vail Clevenger kept studio space there, and she would observe him at work. One day she borrowed some of Clevenger's clay and crafted a likeness of Seth Bass that was of such quality that he encouraged her to continue her art. She was forty-two at the time. She exhibited work at the Athenaeum in 1846–48, and in 1847 worked there briefly as a gallery attendant in the Orpheus Room, but ill health combined with financial pressures caused her to give up sculpting and return to sewing in her last years. Quiner died either at her sister's residence in Lynn or in her hometown of Beverly, and is buried in the Central Cemetery in Beverly. A laudatory notice appeared in the Beverly Citizen around the time of her death.

Quiner appears to have worked exclusively in plaster during her career. Her best-known work is a portrait of Robert Rantoul, cast in plaster and presented to the Athenaeum in 1842; it was the first sculpture by a woman to be shown there when it was exhibited in 1846. She also crafted portrait busts of Fitch Poole, Alonzo Lewis, William H. Lovett, Andrew Thorndike, and James Frothingham, whose own portrait of the sculptor is held by the Beverly Public Library. In the Beverly Historical Society collection are portrait busts of the artist's father and of Phebe Ann Coffin Hanaford, a good friend. Hanaford wrote a biographical sketch of Quiner, and also penned two sonnets inspired by her and her work.

References

1796 births
1868 deaths
American women sculptors
American textile designers
19th-century American sculptors
19th-century American women artists
People from Beverly, Massachusetts
Sculptors from Massachusetts